The Rangeline Conference was an IHSAA-Sanctioned High School Athletic Conference that lasted from 1965 to 1999, containing schools in Boone, Clinton, Delaware, Hamilton, Hancock, Hendricks, Howard, Marion, Shelby, and Tipton Counties in Central Indiana at various points, though never having more than five counties represented at one time, and the largest membership at once being eight schools.

The conference began as the Mid-Capital Conference in 1965, following the breakup of the Hamilton County Conference due to consolidation. The six school loop was down to four by 1970, but expanded to 7 by 1972 and rebranded itself as the Rangeline, since its footprint was no longer confined to the northern suburbs of Indianapolis. While the conference was stable at 8 schools from 1975 to 1989, size differences and geography plagued Rangeline for its remaining 11 years, until its demise in 2000.

Membership

 Hamilton Southeastern opened as a renaming of Fishers in 1965, since no schools consolidated with FHS, despite the new mascot and colors. Eventually a new Fishers High School would split from HSEHS, reviving the old FHS mascot and colors.

Membership Timeline

Resources
Rangeline Conference Lifespan

Indiana high school athletic conferences
High school sports conferences and leagues in the United States
Indiana High School Athletic Association disestablished conferences
1965 establishments in Indiana
2000 disestablishments in Indiana